Juan Rentería (died 1626) was a Roman Catholic prelate who served as the fourth Bishop of Nueva Segovia (1618–1626).

Biography
Juan Rentería was born in Guadalajara, Spain.
On 5 March 1618, he was appointed during the papacy of Pope Paul V as Bishop of Nueva Segovia.
He served as Bishop of Nueva Segovia until his death in 1626.

References 

17th-century Roman Catholic bishops in the Philippines
Bishops appointed by Pope Paul V
1626 deaths
People from Vigan